Karl Paul von Quosdanovich (in some sources also Quasdanovich or Guosdanovich; 1763 – 5 February 1817) was a Croatian nobleman and general in the Habsburg monarchy imperial army service.was a Habsburg nobleman and general. He achieved the rank of major general and was awarded the Knight's Cross of the Military Order of Maria Theresa in 1801 and the Commander's Cross of the same order of merit in 1814.

Biography
Baron Karl Paul von Quosdanovich was born in Brezovac Žumberački near Samobor (at the time in the Kingdom of Croatia within Habsburg Monarchy), which is in Žumberak, a range of mountains between Croatia and Slovenia, known for his uskoks, the refugees from parts of Croatia occupied by the Ottoman Empire and traditional guerrilla soldiers. The Gvozdanović family surname dates back to Raška and Zeta in the Middle Ages. He was a relative of Petar Vid Gvozdanović, Fieldmarshal Lieutenant, who distinguished himself in the War of the Bavarian Succession (1778–1779) and the War of the First Coalition (1792–1797).

Having started his military career as a young man, he was promoted gradually, becoming captain in 1796,  major in 1801, colonel in 1809, and finally major general on 12 May 1813. He fought in many battles during several wars at the end of the 18th and the beginning of the 19th century (Austro–Turkish War (1787–1791), French Revolutionary Wars, Napoleonic Wars). For his merits he was awarded the Knight's Cross of the Order of Maria Theresa in the 66th promotion ceremony which took place on 18 August 1801, as well as the Commander's Cross on 8 March 1814.

Quosdanovich died at the beginning of 1817 in Pančevo, a town in Banat Military Frontier of the Habsburg monarchy (now Serbia), at the age of 53.

See also
 List of Military Order of Maria Theresa recipients of Croatian descent
 List of Croatian soldiers
 Croatian nobility
 List of noble families of Croatia

External links
Karlo Pavao - a distinguished member of the Gvozdanović noble family
Gvozdanović (Quosdanovich) in a list of generals of the Habsburg monarchy imperial and royal army
A short biography
Colonel Quosdanović was chief of staff of the 4th Army Corps in 1809
Military Order of Maria Theresa recipients and their promotions

Barons of Croatia
Croatian military personnel in Austrian armies
18th-century Croatian military personnel
19th-century Croatian military personnel
Austrian generals
Croatian nobility
19th-century Croatian people
1763 births
1817 deaths
People of the Military Frontier
People from Žumberak, Croatia
Habsburg Croats
Commanders Cross of the Military Order of Maria Theresa
18th-century Croatian nobility
19th-century Croatian nobility